Pen-y-Bont railway station is a railway station serving the village of Penybont, in mid Wales. The station is located closer to the villages of Crossgates and Fron than it is to Penybont itself, and is now the closest station to the town of Rhayader, about 9 miles to the west.

Facilities
The station is an unstaffed request stop with one active platform (the disused southbound one is still visible). It is provided with the same amenities as other Heart of Wales line stations, including CIS display, customer help point, timetable poster board and payphone. A small wooden waiting shelter is located near to the information screen, with a barrow crossing linking the platform to the car park and main entrance from the A44.

Services
All trains serving the station are operated by Transport for Wales. There are four trains a day in each direction from Monday to Saturday (plus a fifth northbound train on weekdays only), and two services on Sundays.

References

Further reading

External links 

Railway stations in Powys
DfT Category F1 stations
Former London and North Western Railway stations
Railway stations in Great Britain opened in 1865
Heart of Wales Line
Railway stations served by Transport for Wales Rail
Railway request stops in Great Britain